Arnaud Patrick Honoré (born 22 March 1993) is a French professional footballer who plays as a midfielder for Championnat National 3 club Aubervilliers.

Honours 
Alki Oroklini
 Cypriot Second Division: 2016–17

References

External links 
 
 

1993 births
Living people
Sportspeople from Suresnes
French footballers
Association football midfielders
Entente SSG players
Paris Saint-Germain F.C. players
Amiens SC players
Nea Salamis Famagusta FC players
Alki Oroklini players
FCM Aubervilliers players
Championnat National 2 players
Championnat National 3 players
Championnat National players
Cypriot First Division players
Cypriot Second Division players
French expatriate footballers
Expatriate footballers in Cyprus
French expatriate sportspeople in Cyprus
Footballers from Hauts-de-Seine